De La Salle College is a Catholic private school for boys in the Melbourne suburb of Malvern. The college was founded in 1912 by the De La Salle Brothers, a religious order based on the teachings of Jean-Baptiste de la Salle, and is a member of the Associated Catholic Colleges. The college consists of three campuses (Tiverton, Holy Eucharist and Kinnoull) located in Malvern and Malvern East. De La Salle's sister school is Star of the Sea College.

Timeline

1911 – Father Simon Hegarty CM, parish priest of Malvern, announced that a boys school was to be established, conducted by the Brothers of Christian Schools.

1912 – On 4 February, Brother Dunstan Drumm, Brother Leopold Loughran and Brother Jerome Foley arrived in Melbourne from Waterford, Ireland. The following day, they commenced teaching 54 boys in the Parish Hall. On Easter Tuesday, Archbishop Thomas Carr blessed the new school in Stanhope Street West.
1926 – The brothers were operating  a junior (primary), senior and  boarding school. The first edition of the college magazine Blue and Gold was published, and the first student to complete his leaving certificate finished.
1929 – The house Manresa on the corner of Stanhope and Dalny Streets was purchased and the Tower Building was erected, blessed and opened by Archbishop Daniel Mannix. The old Stanhope building was sold to Melbourne and Metropolitan Tramways Trust. The Old Collegians' Association was formed.

1937 - The  college's  "crowded" boarding school closed with  many  boarders enrolling at  St Bede's College,  established in 1938 in Mentone by the De La Salle Brothers.
1944 – Two-classroom buildings on the corner of Stanhope and Dalny Streets was constructed on the site of a tennis court.
1946 – The Old Collegians' Association was reformed after it lapsed during the Second World War.
1948 – The World War II shrine was erected on Stanhope Street.
1954 – On 21 March, Archbishop Mannix officially opened Kinnoull (named after Kinnoull Hill), the then preparatory school for the College.
1959 – Gardens to the east of the homestead Kinnoull were removed to create what is now known as Kinnoull Oval.
1960 – The new senior school, on High Street, now the Brother Oswald Murdoch Building, was erected. The Fathers' Association was formed.
1962 – The former Gymnasium and Hall, now the Performing Arts Centre, was erected.
1967 – Kinnoull homestead was demolished.
1972 – Manresa was demolished and the Brothers moved to a new residence on High Street. The Brother Jerome Foley Library and the now Brother Dunstan Drumm Administration building was opened on High Street. Father Les Troy, CM, was appointed College Chaplain.
1983 – The Lasallian Award was introduced by the Old Collegians' Association.
1984 – The Brother Peter Duffy Memorial Building was opened and the Kinnoull Campus became the Senior School for Years 11 and 12.
1987 – The Brother Stanislaus Carmody Centre for the Arts and Technology was opened.
1988 – The Brother James Taylor Gymnasium was opened.
1990 – The Brother Damian Harvey Building was opened.
1995 – The High Street campus was renamed, Tiverton, after the former Brothers' residence on Stanhope Street (which, in turn, was named after Tiverton, Devonshire).
2004 – The Old Collegians' building was opened on the Kinnoull campus. Year 10 classes move to Kinnoull for the first time in the College's history.
2007 – The Old Collegians' Association executive committee was reformed.
2009 – The St Miguel Theatre attached to the Brother Adrian Fitzgerald Building (colloquially known as the Chapel Building) was opened.
2012 – De La Salle celebrated their 100th anniversary of the school's opening.
2014 - The College's first lay principal Peter Houlihan began his term. 
2014 - 1,200 students enrolled across all campuses. 
2019 - The 3rd Campus, Holy Eucharist was opened at 1241 Dandenong Road, Malvern East. This campus is exclusive to Year 9.
2019 - After over 100 years, due to a decline in enrolments, Year 4 has ceased being offered.
2022 - 980 students enrolled across all campuses.

Campuses
There are three campuses, Tiverton, Kinnoull and Holy Eucharist, all within Malvern. Because of their proximity and for government funding reasons they are considered one campus.

Approximately 430 students in years 10–12 occupy Kinnoull Campus, adjacent to Malvern Cricket Ground and Malvern Library. The site was purchased in 1955, and was initially a junior campus until it was established as the senior campus in 1984. De La Salle offer multiple pathways including VCE, VET and VCAL Facilities include a chapel, Saint Miguel lecture theatre, amphitheatre, library, oval, and a cafeteria style canteen.  

The Holy Eucharist Campus includes a dedicated Arts area, modern classrooms with up to date AV technology, a multipurpose school hall, bike and storage amenities, basketball court and located next door to the Holy Eucharist Parish Church. The campus offers an independent curriculum for year 9 students exclusively and is considered a formative year of personal development and growth for year 9 students prior to joining the Kinnoull Campus in Year 10.

Tiverton Campus is located on High Street and is home to year 5–8 students. Facilities include recently refurbished classrooms, a Performing Arts Centre, gymnasium, weights room, basketball courts, a chapel, large library and dedicated arts and technology spaces. The Rheims centre is an advanced technical and science space opened in 2018.

Sport
As a member of the Associated Catholic Colleges, interschool competition is offered to year 7–12 students in:
 Athletics
 Australian Rules Football
 Basketball
 Chess
 Cricket
 Cross country running
 Golf
 Swimming
 Hockey
 Soccer
 Table tennis
 Tennis
 Volleyball

ACC matches are timetabled into the school week. Students are also involved in state and national level competitions in athletics, snow sports and weightlifting.

The college is known for its experienced football squads, having won the Senior football competition 52 times since its entry in 1948.

ACC premierships 
De La Salle has won the following ACC premierships.

 Athletics (26) - 1944, 1945, 1946, 1947, 1963, 1964, 1965, 1967, 1973, 1978, 1979, 1980, 1981, 1982, 1984, 1985, 1993, 1994, 1995, 1996, 1997, 1998, 1999, 2000, 2002, 2016
 Basketball (2) - 1992, 2008
 Cricket (20) - 1932, 1934, 1939, 1945, 1951, 1954, 1956, 1957, 1959, 1973, 1975, 1989, 1990, 1992, 1993, 2010, 2011, 2014, 2016, 2017
 Cross Country (7) - 1993, 1994, 2000, 2001, 2002, 2003, 2004
 Football (18) - 1935, 1936, 1939, 1941, 1942, 1943, 1944, 1945, 1947, 1958, 1960, 1977, 1987, 1989, 1990, 2002, 2003, 2008
 Golf (5) - 2010, 2011, 2013, 2017, 2019
 Handball (2) - 1942, 1948
 Hockey (2) - 1998, 2019
 Soccer - 1984
 Swimming (20) - 1942, 1943, 1952, 1953, 1956, 1957, 1958, 1974, 1975, 1976, 1978, 1979, 1980, 1981, 1982, 1983, 1993, 1996, 2018, 2019
 Tennis (13) - 1934, 1935, 1944, 1948, 1949, 1951, 1954, 1985, 1986, 1987, 1988, 1989, 2000

Mission Action Day

On the final day of term 1, the college participates in Mission Action Day (formerly Charity Action Day), which consists of a 13 km walk from Kooyong Stadium to T.H. King Oval, Glen Iris and back.

The walk is usually completed in two hours, with students sponsored for completing the walk, thereby raising much needed funds for schools in third-world countries, including the Philippines and Indonesia. This event has raised $30,000 AUD in 2021.

Yaluwo
The De La Salle 'Yaluwo' are a group of recently graduated Year 12 students who travel to Sri Lanka to work on projects that help the Sri Lankan Lasallian community at Diyagala Boys Town. Money raised by the students throughout the year goes towards the completion of the projects.

The De La Salle students work as labourers for approximately four weeks and while they are doing so, live with the De La Salle Brothers and immerse themselves in the community they are helping. This is an alternate way for students to celebrate their year 12 graduation whilst contributing to underprivileged communities. All students must commit to the immersion at the start of their year 12-year and raise a minimum amount per student for the building projects. Students also cover their own transport and living costs.

Patron saint
St. Jean-Baptiste De La Salle was born in Reims, France on 30 April 1651. He was 29 years old when he realised that the educational system of his day was inadequate to meet the needs of poor children. To provide a Christian and human education that would be practical and effective, La Salle founded a religious community of men, the Institute of the Brothers of the Christian Schools (Fratres Scholarum Christianarum), dedicated to the instruction of youth.

After many hardships, Jean-Baptiste De La Salle died on Good Friday, 7 April 1719. He was canonised a saint of the Catholic Church in 1900 and declared "Universal Patron of All Teachers" by Pope Pius XII in 1950. The feast of St. Jean-Baptiste De La Salle is celebrated on 15 May by the worldwide La Sallian movement of approximately 1 million students in over 85 countries.

Royal Commission into Institutional Responses to Child Sexual Abuse 2013-17
The Royal Commission estimated that 13.8 percent of De La Salle Brothers, Australia wide, were alleged perpetrators of child sexual abuse. De La Salle Malvern are known to have had two brothers actively offending whilst teaching at the college. One, Brother Frank 'Ibar' Terrence Keating, was sentenced in 2018 to five years and three months in jail for indecently assaulting eight students between 1969 and 1977.

Houses
There are four Houses:
 St Mark's (red)
 St Edwin's (green)
 St Leo's (blue)
 St Austin's (yellow)
Houses help create a sense of belonging and identity for students within the College.

Classroom saints 
Each classroom at the Tiverton campus in De La Salle has a patron saint. There are seven in total.

Benilde 
Peter Romancon (Brother Benildus) was born in Thuret, France, on 14 June 1805. He worked quietly and effectively as a teacher and principal, educating boys – many of whom had never been to school before – in Saugues, an isolated village on a barren plateau in southern France. It was said of him that he was "always cheerful" in the daily routine of school. He died at Saugues on 13 August 1862, and was declared Blessed on 4 April 1942. He was canonised on 29 October 1967, and his feast day is 13 August.

Dunstan 
Brother Dunstan Drumm was born in Ireland on 11 July 1880 in Ardee, County Louth, and arrived in Australia in 1912. He became the first Headmaster of De La Salle College and remained in that position from 1912–1917. He then taught in New South Wales, eventually returning to Ireland in 1922 where he taught in schools there and in England. He died on 24 September 1952 and is buried in Kintbury, UK.

Hegarty 
Father Simon Hegarty CM arrived at St Joseph's Parish Church in Malvern in 1895 and was instrumental in negotiating the appointment of the De La Salle Brothers to Malvern to open a school for boys. His term as Parish Priest ended in 1914 when he volunteered as War Chaplain. He later returned to his homeland, Ireland, where he died on Christmas Eve 1935.

Jerome 
Brother Jerome Foley was born in Ireland on 9 August 1886 and is one of the original three brothers who commenced De La Salle College, Malvern, on 5 February 1912. He is the longest-serving Headmaster of the College from 1929–1946, which was followed by his appointment as Provincial of the De La Salle Brothers from 1929–1958. Brother Jerome died on 9 September 1975, and is buried in the Brothers Cemetery at Oakhill College in Sydney. Behind a somewhat gruff exterior, Brother Jerome concealed a sensitive heart. He had an uncanny knack for bringing badgering or cajoling them. He nurtured a whole group of young men remarkable for their academic achievements and for their loyalty to the church.

Roland 
Nicholas Roland, born in Rheims on 2 December 1642, founded the congregation of the Holy Infant (Child) Jesus. As the spiritual Father of Saint John Baptist De La Salle, he approached him as his executor and begged him to secure the approval of the congregation of the Sister of the Infant Jesus, which he founded for the instruction and salvation of poor and abandoned children. He died on 27 April 1678. His feast day is 27 April.

Solomon 
Nicholas Leclercq (Brother Solomon) was born at Boulogne-sur-Mer, France, on 15 November 1745. During the French Revolution he refused to take the oath to the Constitution and died a martyr on 2 September 1792 in the prison of Carmes (Carmelites), Paris. He was proclaimed as Blessed with his companion martyrs on 17 October 1926. His feast day is 2 September.

Vincent 
St Vincent de Paul was born in the village of Pouy in Gascony, France, in about 1580, and was ordained as a priest in 1600. In 1617, he began to preach missions, and in 1625 he founded Congregation of the Mission – or Vincentians – who now administer to St Joseph's Parish in Malvern. St Vincent is the Patron saint of the St Vincent de Paul Society (Vinnies), founded in Paris in 1833 by the Blessed Frederic Ozanam. His feast day is 27 September.

Notable alumni

Arts, academia, entertainment and media
Jason Donovan – Former Neighbours actor and musician who sold more than 3 million albums in the UK
Peter Drake AO – Emeritus Professor, Foundation Vice Chancellor, Australian Catholic University, Order of Australia
Edward Duyker OAM – historian, author and fellow of the Australian Academy of the Humanities. Numerous awards include Order of Australia and Ordre des Palmes Académiques.
Archimede Fusillo – author
Paul Hogan – butler of US reality show Joe Millionaire
Jules Lund – presenter on Getaway, in 2010 he joined Fifi Box to host drive nationally on Austereo's Fox FM, a role which saw him win Best Newcomer at the 2011 Australian Commercial Radio Awards.
Stephen McIntyre – Associate Professor of Music, University of Melbourne, renowned pianist, founding member of Australian Chamber Soloist
Gerald Murnane – fiction writer nominated for 2006 Nobel Prize for literature
Ruby Rees Wemyss - actress, Miss Fisher's Murder Mysteries (2013), Picnic at Hanging Rock (2018).
Tony Stewart – sound recordist, one of the Balibo Five murdered by the Indonesian military in 1975
Geoffrey Tozer –  classical pianist
Alphonse Gangitano – Melbourne gangland killings

Religion
Eric D'Arcy – late Archbishop of Hobart (1988–1999)

Law
Tony Pagone – judge of the Federal Court of Australia; until 21 June 2013 he was a judge of the Supreme Court of Victoria
Bernard Teague AO – Supreme Court Judge, former president of The Law Institute of Victoria, Victorian Legal Personality of the Year 1985, Officer of the Order of Australia 2008, appointed to head royal commission into Victoria's bushfires in February 2009, and was created an Officer of the Order of Australia in the Australia Day Honours, 2009
John Harber Phillips – AC, QC (18 October 1933 – 7 August 2009) appointed as Chief Justice of the Supreme Court of Victoria in 1991; barrister, author, and judge. Best known for defending Lindy Chamberlain against the charge of murdering baby Azaria. Later became the first director of public prosecutions of Victoria and director of National Crime Authority
Greg Barns – barrister
Bruce Anthony Chamberlain AM- (9 August 1939 – 1 October 2005) 17th President of the Legislative Council of Victorian Parliament and former school captain. Member of the Order of Australia.

Politics
James Ingram AO – former Australian diplomat and former executive director of the United Nations World Food Program

Business
Michael Luscombe – CEO of Woolworths Limited, 19th largest retailer in the world

Sport
VFL/AFL Players:
Jack Higgins - Richmond
Brayden Maynard (2014) – Collingwood
Fletcher Roberts - Western Bulldogs, premiership player 2016
Jarryd Lyons (2010) – Adelaide, Gold Coast, Brisbane Lions
Corey Maynard - Melbourne Football Club
Daniel Hughes (2004) – Melbourne
Thomas Murphy (2003) – Hawthorn
Andrew Carrazzo (2001) – Carlton
Trent Croad (1997) – Hawthorn, Fremantle Hawks Premiership Player 2008
Brian Stynes (1990) – Melbourne
Barry Breen – St Kilda Grand Final Legend, 301 game veteran, Sydney Swans manager of operations
Pat Cash Sr. – Hawthorn Footballer and father of Wimbledon Winner Pat Cash
Jamie Duursma – Sydney Swans, Brisbane Bears, Melbourne
Frank Dimattina – Richmond. Player then team manager and father of Western Bulldogs player Paul Dimattina
Jack Dyer – OAM (15 November 1913 – 23 August 2003), Richmond Captain/Coach, AFL Hall of Fame Legend 1996, AFL Team of the Century
Bob Johnson – Melbourne
Bernie Jones – Hawthorn, Essendon – Hawks 1976 Premiership Player
Peter Murnane – Hawthorn – 1976, 1978 Premiership Player
Peter O'Donohue – Hawthorn – Player and Coach
John Kennedy Sr. – Hawthorn – Hawthorn premiership coach 1961, 1971, 1976.Icon of the game. Team of the Century Coach
John Kennedy Jr. – Hawthorn – Premiership Player for Hawthorn 1983, 1986, 1988,1989
Felix Russo – St Kilda
Michael Nugent – Richmond
Terry Waters – Collingwood Captain 1970/1971
Paul Cooper – Hawthorn
Roger Ellingworth – Melbourne, Hawthorn
Kevin Sheedy –  Richmond football club. Essendon football coach Premiership coach 1984/85, 1993, 2000, Greater Western Sydney coach 2013
Sport – Other:
Ashton Agar (2011) – Australian Test Cricketer, made 98 on debut holding a number of world records
Wes Agar – Cricketer
Danny Nikolic – Jockey
Michael Beer (2002) – Australian test cricketer
Michael Valkanis – Footballer, South Melbourne, Larissa, Adelaide United, capped once for Australia
Brian Stynes – Gaelic Footballer and premiership all-star award winner 1995
Adrian Kebbe – Weightlifter, Australian Commonwealth Games Silver Medal at the 1978 Commonwealth Games
Damian Brown – Weightlifter, Australian Olympic weightlifter and flag bearer at the 2002 Commonwealth Games
Simon Heffernan – Weightlifter, silver medalist at the 2006 Commonwealth Games, twice Australia Day ambassador
Andrew Collett – Olympic judo player
Seb Gotch – cricket
Ben Ayre – basketball

References

External links
 De La Salle College Website
 De La Salle Old Collegians Australian Rules Amateur Football Club Website

Catholic secondary schools in Melbourne
Malvern
Associated Catholic Colleges
Rock Eisteddfod Challenge participants
Boys' schools in Victoria (Australia)
Educational institutions established in 1912
1912 establishments in Australia
Buildings and structures in the City of Stonnington